Ahmad Khan of Quba (1769–1791) was a Khan of Quba and a successor of Fatali Khan who managed to dominate Derbent, Baku, Talysh and Shirvan Khanates, as well as Salyan Sultanate during much of his reign.

Early life 
He was born in 1769 to Fatali Khan and Tuti Bike, sister of Amir Hamza, Utsmi of Kaitags. He was named after his grandfather Ahmad Khan, Utsmi of Kaitags. At the age of 18, he was married to Kichik Bike, daughter of Tarki shamkhal Bammat II in 1787 as part of his father's marriage diplomacy. As his father expected successor, he was already involved in state affairs. According to a document, he granted a waqf status to Pir Khidir Zinda in 1787.

Reign 
On May 30, general Tekeli reported to Russian President of the College of War Grigory Potemkin that, associates of the khan concealed his death in order to secure his succession.

Ahmad Khan died in March 1791 after ruling the khanate mere 2 years.

References

Sources 

 
 
 
 

1791 deaths
1769 births
Khans of Quba